NGC 6040 is a spiral galaxy located about 550 million light-years away in the constellation Hercules. NGC 6040 was discovered by astronomer Édouard Stephan on June 27, 1870. NGC 6040 is interacting with the lenticular galaxy PGC 56942. As a result of this interaction, NGC 6040's southern spiral arm has been warped in the direction toward PGC 56942. NGC 6040 and PGC 56942 are both members of the Hercules Cluster.

Neutral hydrogen depletion
NGC 6040 and PGC 56942 are both depleted of their neutral hydrogen content. This depletion may have been caused as both galaxies fell into the Hercules Cluster and interacted with the surrounding intracluster medium (ICM). This interaction would have caused ram-pressure stripping and in effect removed the gas in the two galaxies.

See also
 List of NGC objects (6001–7000)
 Arp 120
 Arp 272

References

External links

Hercules (constellation)
Intermediate spiral galaxies
Interacting galaxies
6040
056932
122
10165
Astronomical objects discovered in 1870
Hercules Cluster
Discoveries by Édouard Stephan